North Fork River may refer to several places:

North Fork River (Missouri–Arkansas),  a tributary of the White River
North Fork Double Mountain Fork Brazos River, a tributary of the Brazos River, Texas
North Fork Gunnison River, a tributary of the Gunnison River in Colorado
North Fork Redbank Creek, a tributary of Redbank Creek in Pennsylvania
North Fork Skykomish River, a tributary of the Snoqualmie River in Washington

See also 
North Fork (disambiguation)